Hitched may refer to:
 Hitched (1971 film), an American made-for-television film
 Hitched (2005 film), an American TV film

See also
 Hitched or Ditched